John Henry Donnelly (March 19, 1905 – August 19, 1986) was a Canadian coxswain, born in Toronto, Ontario, Canada who competed in the 1928 Summer Olympics.

In 1928 he won the bronze medal as cox of the Canadian boat in the men's eight competition. Donnelly was a coach at the Argonaut Rowing Club of Toronto, which represented Canada in the Olympics.

References

External links
 John Donnelly's profile at databaseOlympics
 

1905 births
1986 deaths
Rowers from Toronto
Canadian male rowers
Coxswains (rowing)
Olympic bronze medalists for Canada
Olympic rowers of Canada
Rowers at the 1928 Summer Olympics
Olympic medalists in rowing
Medalists at the 1928 Summer Olympics